The Lunar Terrain Vehicle (LTV) is an unpressurized rover being developed by NASA that astronauts can drive on the Moon while wearing their spacesuits. The development of the LTV is a part of NASA's Artemis Program which involves returning astronauts to the Moon, specifically the lunar south pole, by 2025. The Lunar Terrain Vehicle will be the first lunar rover developed by NASA since the Lunar Roving Vehicle used during the Apollo program.

History 
On February 6, 2020, NASA issued a request, seeking industry feedback on relevant state-of-the-art commercial technologies and acquisition strategies for a new Lunar Terrain Vehicle. NASA also stated in the request that they want the new LTV to draw on recent innovations in electric vehicle energy storage and management, autonomous driving, and extreme environment resistance.”

On August 31, 2021, NASA released another request to private companies for additional input on approaches and solutions for a vehicle to transport Artemis astronauts around the lunar south pole. NASA also asked if American companies are interested in providing the LTV as a commercial service, or as a product NASA would purchase and own.

On Nov 2, 2022, NASA issued a draft Request for Proposals (RFP) for the LTV as a service (LTVS). The draft was open for feedback until December 1, 2022, with a planned Final RFP release date of on or about February 8, 2023, a proposals due date approximately 30 days later, and an anticipated contract award date of on or about July 19, 2023.

On January 27, 2023, NASA published an update stating that it anticipated that the LTVS Final RFP release will be delayed until no-later-than May 26, 2023.

LTV Proposals 
Three proposals for a Lunar Terrain Vehicle have been publicly unveiled since NASA's initial request.
 On May 26, 2021, Lockheed Martin and General Motors announced they would be teaming up to design a Lunar Terrain Vehicle (LTV) for NASA capable of transporting astronauts across the lunar surface. On April 5, 2022, MDA Ltd. announced they would work with Lockheed Martin and General Motors to integrate MDA’s commercial robotic arm technology on their planned human-rated lunar mobility vehicles. On July 20, 2022, Goodyear announced they would join Lockheed Martin and General Motors and develop tires for the LTV drawing from its advanced airless tire technology.
 On November 16, 2021, Northrop Grumman announced they would team up with  AVL, Intuitive Machines, Lunar Outpost, and Michelin to design a Lunar Terrain Vehicle (LTV) to transport NASA’s Artemis astronauts around the lunar surface.
 On April 7, 2022, Teledyne Brown Engineering announced that it would lead a team including Sierra Space and Nissan North America to design a crewed Lunar Terrain Vehicle (LTV) that will support future exploration on the Moon. On September 22, 2022, Teledyne announced that Bridgestone would also join its team and provide tires for the LTV.

Plans 
NASA currently plans to launch the Lunar Terrain Vehicle on Artemis 5. The Lunar Terrain Vehicle will be a co-manifested payload on a Space Launch System Block 1B rocket in which the rover will ride on the Exploration Upper Stage right below the Orion spacecraft.

See also
 Lunar Roving Vehicle, the 1970s Apollo program equivalent used on Apollo 15, 16, and 17
 Space Exploration Vehicle, previous NASA concept for a multipurpose crewed rover

References

Lunar rovers
Missions to the Moon
2025 in spaceflight